The Snyder Guard Station by the Moyie River in Kaniksu National Forest, in the vicinity of Eastport, Idaho, dates from 1908.  A historic district encompassing the station was listed on the National Register of Historic Places as Snyder Guard Station Historical District in 1983.  The listed area included nine contributing buildings.

The ranger's house was constructed in 1908.  It is a one-story six room  frame house built on a concrete foundation. It has a gable roof covered by wooden shingles and it has two brick chimneys.  Two other dwellings, a meat house, a cook house, a wash house/workshop, a warehouse/office, and other structures were built later.

References

Historic districts on the National Register of Historic Places in Idaho
Buildings and structures completed in 1908
Boundary County, Idaho
Ranger stations in Idaho